Tiago André Ramos Terroso (born 13 January 1988) is a Portuguese former professional footballer who played as a midfielder.

Club career
Born in Vila do Conde, Terroso spent most of his youth career with hometown club Rio Ave FC, as well as a year in the ranks of FC Porto. He made his first senior appearances (three games) for the former in the Liga de Honra in the 2006–07 season, and after a loan to F.C. Pampilhosa of the third division he added a further four matches in the Primeira Liga in 2009–10, three from the bench.

Terroso then moved up the road to Varzim S.C. of the second tier, and a year later U.D. Leiria in the first. In February 2012, he moved abroad for the first time to FC Chornomorets Odesa of the Ukrainian Premier League on a contract until June 2014.

Rarely used during his time in Eastern Europe, Terroso returned to his country's top flight in January 2013, signing for S.C. Olhanense on a 2-year deal. In June that year, he moved across the league to Vitória F.C. in a deal valid for two seasons.

After his contract with the club from Setúbal expired, Terroso was unemployed up to November 2015, when he and Tiago Cintra were taken on by Varzim. He made three appearances for the reserve team, in division three.

References

External links

1988 births
Living people
People from Vila do Conde
Sportspeople from Porto District
Portuguese footballers
Association football midfielders
Primeira Liga players
Liga Portugal 2 players
Segunda Divisão players
Rio Ave F.C. players
Padroense F.C. players
FC Pampilhosa players
Varzim S.C. players
U.D. Leiria players
S.C. Olhanense players
Vitória F.C. players
Ukrainian Premier League players
FC Chornomorets Odesa players
Portuguese expatriate footballers
Expatriate footballers in Ukraine
Portuguese expatriate sportspeople in Ukraine